Nothing Even Matters may refer to:

 "Nothing Even Matters", a 2010 song by Big Time Rush from BTR
 "Nothing Even Matters", a 1998 song by Lauryn Hill from The Miseducation of Lauryn Hill